In S v D, an important case in South African criminal law, the appellant had attempted to rape an eleven-year-old girl. He was a 44-year-old first offender. The complainant had not suffered physical injuries; there was no evidence of psychological damage. The sentence was altered on appeal to three years' imprisonment, half suspended.

See also 
 South African criminal law

References 
 S v D 1995 (2) SACR 502 (C).

Notes 

1995 in South African law
1995 in case law
South African criminal case law